Discophlebia lucasii, or Lucas' stub moth, is a moth of the family Oenosandridae first described by Rudolph Rosenstock in 1885. It is found in the south-east quarter of Australia.

The wingspan is about 50 mm.

References

Oenosandridae